Berry and Dolly is a Hungarian animated series for children based on the book series of the same name by . All four current series are produced and directed by Géza M. Tóth through the  animation studio.

The series consists of five-minute episodes and each individual series is released as a compiled film. In 2010, the first film became the third most watched film in Hungary. The series has been translated into English, Slovenian, Serbian, Romanian, and Czech. It has enjoyed success through its televisation on the channel Minimax.

Recognition and Awards 
In 2011, the KEDD animation studio won the Best Short Film award at the Jiangyin 11th International Children's Film Festival for the episode Alfonzo's Fiddle (Hungarian: Tücsök hegedűje).

In 2012, Berry and Dolly was shown at the Tokyo International Anime Fair.

In 2013, the film won a "Cartoon Kids" award at the Cartoon Club Animation festival in Italy.

In 2013, the film also won the audience choice award at the Kecskemét animation film festival.

In 2017, the film won the judges' choice award at the 6th international animation festival in Xi'an, China.

Berry and Dolly has also been a part of other film festivals such as the Zlín Film Festival, the Basauri-Bizkaia International Animated Film Festival, and AniFest ROZAFA.

Episodes

Series 1 
This series was released as the film Berry and Dolly - Friends (original title: Bogyó és Babóca - Barátok) in 2010.

Series 2 
This series was released as the film Berry and Dolly - Gingerbread (original title: Bogyó és Babóca 2.  - Mézeskalács) in 2011.

Series 3 
This series was released as the film Berry and Dolly - Playmates (original title: Bogyó és Babóca 3. - Játszótársak) in 2012.

Series 4 
This series was released as the film Berry and Dolly - Fairy Cards (original title: Bogyó és Babóca 4. - Tündérkártyák) in 2013 which contained 14 of the 17 episodes (leaving out Doctor Owl Gets Sick, Starship, and Bubble Has Hiccups) due to its runtime.

Series 5

Series 6 
This series was released as the film Berry and Dolly - Farming (original title: Bogyó és Babóca - Mezőgazdasági) in 2015.

References 

Hungarian animated films
Hungarian animated television series